In quantum field theory, scalar chromodynamics, also known as scalar quantum chromodynamics or scalar QCD, is a gauge theory consisting of a gauge field coupled to a scalar field. This theory is used experimentally to model the Higgs sector of the Standard Model.

It arises from a coupling of a scalar field to gauge fields. Scalar fields are used to model certain particles in particle physics; the most important example is the Higgs boson. Gauge fields are used to model forces in particle physics: they are force carriers. When applied to the Higgs sector, these are the gauge fields appearing in electroweak theory, described by Glashow–Weinberg–Salam theory.

Matter content and Lagrangian

Matter content 

This article discusses the theory on flat spacetime , commonly known as Minkowski space.

The model consists of a complex vector valued scalar field  minimally coupled to a gauge field . 

The gauge group of the theory is a Lie group .

Then  is a vector space. The 'scalar' refers to how  transforms (trivially) under the action of the Lorentz group, despite  being vector valued. For concreteness, the representation is often chosen to be the fundamental representation. Another common representation is the adjoint representation. In this representation, varying the Lagrangian below to find the equations of motion gives the Yang–Mills–Higgs equation.

From a geometric point of view,  are the components of a principal connection under a global choice of trivialization (which can be made due to the theory being on flat spacetime).

Lagrangian 

The Lagrangian density arises from minimally coupling the Klein–Gordon Lagrangian (with a potential) to the Yang–Mills Lagrangian. Here the scalar field  is in the fundamental representation of :

where
In geometry this is the curvature form.
  is the coupling constant.
  is the potential.

This straightforwardly generalizes to an arbitrary gauge group , where  takes values in an arbitrary representation  equipped with an invariant inner product , by replacing .

Gauge invariance 
The model is invariant under gauge transformations, which at the group level is a function , and at the algebra level is a function . 

At the group level, the transformations of fields is

From the geometric viewpoint,  is a global change of trivialization. This is why it is a misnomer to call gauge symmetry a symmetry: it is really a redundancy in the description of the system.

Curved spacetime 
The theory admits a generalization to a curved spacetime , but this requires more subtle definitions for many objects appearing in the theory. For example, the scalar field must be viewed as a section of an associated vector bundle with fibre . This is still true on flat spacetime, but the flatness of the base space allows the section to be viewed as a function , which is conceptually simpler.

Higgs mechanism 
In fact the Higgs boson of the Standard Model is modeled by this theory with the choice ; the Higgs boson is also coupled to electromagnetism.

Examples 

By concretely choosing a potential , some familiar theories can be recovered.

Taking  gives Yang–Mills minimally coupled to a Klein–Gordon field with mass .

Taking  gives the potential for the Higgs boson in the Standard Model.

References

See also 
 Scalar electrodynamics
 Quantum chromodynamics

Gauge theories
Quantum chromodynamics